Local Government Commission may refer to:
 
Local Government Commission for England (1958–1967)
Local Government Commission for England (1992)
Local Government Commission (Ireland)
Local Government Commission (New Zealand)
Local Government Commission (Sacramento, California)
North Carolina Local Government Commission

See also
Local Government Board (disambiguation)
Local Government Boundary Commission (disambiguation)

Government commissions